The Paramour Sessions is the fifth studio album and fourth major-label by American rock band Papa Roach. It was released on September 12, 2006 through Geffen Records. Following up from their fourth album Getting Away with Murder, the album confirmed the band's move from nu metal to an alternative rock and hard rock sound. The Paramour Sessions peaked at number 16 on the Billboard 200.

Background
The album's name is a reference to Paramour Mansion, where the album was recorded. Like their prior album, Getting Away with Murder, the album continues the band's movement away from nu metal into more of a hard rock sound. Two singles were released from the album: "...To Be Loved" and "Forever". It is the last album to feature longtime original drummer Dave Buckner before he departed from the band in 2007.

The album was dedicated in the memory of Jacoby Shaddix's step-grandfather Howard William Roatch, the band's namesake, who committed suicide in 2006, following his diagnosis of an unspecified form of terminal cancer. The song "Roses on My Grave" is dedicated to him at live shows.

An alternate release of the album was released on June 12, 2007, which included an alternate cover, a fold-out poster, a cell phone wallpaper, and a free ringtone of the song "Forever". The tracklist was kept constant.

Sales
The second single, "Forever", was successful in the US, peaking at #55 on the Hot 100.

Track listing

Personnel

Papa Roach
 Jacoby Shaddix – lead vocals
 Jerry Horton – guitar, backing vocals
 Tobin Esperance – bass, backing vocals
 Dave Buckner – drums

Additional musicians
 Keyboards by Howard Benson
 Percussion by Lenny Castro
 Piano on "My Heart Is a Fist" & "What Do You Do?" by Jamie Muhoberac
 Strings on "Roses on My Grave" by Jennifer Kuhn & Mark Robertson

Production

 Produced by Howard Benson
 Co-produced by Papa Roach
 Mixed by Chris Lord-Alge
 Recorded by Mike Plotnikoff
 Additional recording by Michael Rosen
 Pro Tools editing by Paul Decarli
 Assistant engineering by Hatsukazu Inagaki
 String arrangements on "Roses on My Grave" by Debbie Lurie
 Recorded at The Paramour Mansion, Silver Lake, Bay 7 Studios, Valley Village, & Sparky Dark Studio, Calabasas, CA
 Strings recorded by Casey Stone at Entourage Studios, North Hollywood, CA
 Mixed at Resonate Music, Burbank, CA
 Assistant mixing by Keith Armstrong & Dim-E
 Mastered by Ted Jensen at Sterling Sound, NY
 Band assistant / life coordinator / master chef at the Paramour: Andres Torres
 A&R: Thom Panunzio
 A&R coordinator: Evan Peters
 Management by: Mike Renault & Dennis Sanders for Focus Three Entertainment
 Booking by Michael Arfin for AGI
 European booking: John Jackson for K2ours
 Business management: Jonathan Schwartz for GSO
 Legal representation: Eric Greenspan for Myman, Abell, Fineman, Greenspan & Light LLP
 Marketing for Geffen: Paul Orescan
 Art direction & design by Greg Patterson
 Additional art direction: Dave Buckner & Jerry Horton
 Coat of arms illustrated by Jeff Toll
 Band photography by Devin Dehaven
 Additional photography by KirstiAnna Urpa, Jerry Horton, Greg Patterson, Dave Buckner

Appearances
 "...To Be Loved" was theme song for WWE Raw from 2006 to 2009.
"...To Be Loved" is also featured in the soundtrack to the 2008 film Never Back Down.
"...To Be Loved" and "The Addict" were featured in the commercial for Crüe Fest that Papa Roach and Buckcherry did.
 "Alive (N' Out Control)" is the theme song of the TV show Scarred, hosted by Jacoby Shaddix.
 "Time Is Running Out" and "Forever" are featured as downloadable tracks for the Rock Band games.
 "SOS" is also featured on the Crüe Fest compilation album.

Charts

References

Papa Roach albums
2006 albums